EganaGoldpfeil (formerly Egana International) designs and makes timepieces and jewelry under brands such as Pierre Cardin and Carrera, as well as licensed names as Bulova or Esprit. They also produce leather goods, eyewear and apparel. Their products are sold in more than 100 countries.

Company has produced and has been selling the most expensive randoseru (approx. US$1000) since 2007.

External links
EganaGoldpfeil Company Description
Corporate Information
Hoover's Profile - EganaGoldpfeil (Holdings) Limited
Official Site 

Jewellery companies of Hong Kong
Companies listed on the Hong Kong Stock Exchange
Watch manufacturing companies